Poechos Reservoir is a middle-sized reservoir on Peru's Chira River in the border area between Peru and Ecuador.
Its purpose is to improve the accumulation of water stocks in the upper part of Peru's Chira basin by flood control, irrigation, drainage and electricity generation.

Location

The Poechos Reservoir is situated in the northernmost part of Peru, in the lower flow of the rivers Chira and Piura, about 50 km north of Piura, the capital of the Piura Region. 
It is located on 4° 3' southern latitude and 80° 2' western longitude at an altitude of 98 m in the Lancones district of the province of Sullana, approximately 30 km from the border with Ecuador.

History

The system was built in support of agrarian reform and infrastructure policies led by the military dictatorship of Juan Velasco Alvarado. Construction was carried out in four phases, the first of which was constructed by Yugoslav contractor Energoprojekt and supervised by the Peruvian subsidiary of British company Binnie & Partners. Works started on 24 June 1972, with inauguration taking place on 4 June 1976.

Phases of the project go as follow:

Phase 1 (1970 to 1977)

The first phase included the construction of 
the rock filled Poechos dam (9 km long with a maximum height of about 55 m and a total excavation volume of 9,000,000 m3;
the diversion tunnel built into the bottom outlet with a maximum capacity of 14 m3/s;
the safety overflow of circa 200 m length with a capacity up to 10,000 m3/s;
the headwater discharge and the headwater channel with a capacity of 70 m3/s (8,00,000 m3 excavation and 1,000,000 m3 of concrete for channel lining);
the channel drainage system in the lower Chira (10,000,000 m3 excavation in total) flows through over 1,000 structures on the channel network (overflows, outlets, gates, etc.)

Phase 2 (1978 to 1985)

The second phase covered 
the headwater dam Los Ejedos which is 220 m long with a maximum height of 20 m and a gate capacity of 3,000 m3/s;
the main channel, which is 42 km long and has a capacity of 45 m3/s;
the protecting embankments (60 km long) along the Piura;
the channel system with supporting structures over an area of 350 km2.

Phase 3 (1985 to 1997)

The third phase consisted of 
the headwater dam Sullana which is 75 m long, has a maximum height of 12 m and has gates with a total capacity of up to 5,000 m3/s;
the headwater channel Norte with a capacity of 25,500 m3/s over 56 km which irrigate 150 km2;
the channel Sur which is circa 35 km long with a capacity of 7 m3/s for irrigation of about 70 km2 (in total about 5,000,000 m3 excavation);
about 60 km of dykes along the regulated river bed in the lower Chira flow (about 5,500,000 m3 of embankment).

Phase 4 (2002 to 2004)

The final phase included 
the 12.5 MW Curumuy dam and power plant, completed in 2000;
the 15.4 MW Poechos I Hydroelectric Project which was completed in 2004.

Capacities

The capacity of the reservoir is 1,000,000,000 m3, its catchment area 14,000 m2, its maximum depth 46 m.

The irrigation dam is 49 m high and 9 km wide at crest and at its bottom has a conduit to discharge water at a rate of 4 m3/s.

The original design brief was to revitalise the Piura valley, which was short of water, and provide modern irrigation for approximately 350 km2 of arable land.

The Poechos I Hydroelectric Plant is operated by Sindicato Energético S.A (SINERSA). The Poechos I power house has 15.4 MW in installed capacity and generates 60 GW·h annually for Electronoroeste, the concessionary for energy distribution in northwestern Peru. The power plant is to accomplish a 90% national electrification level of the country by the year 2010 by using a zero emission energy source.

References

External links
UNFCCC Project 0086: Poechos
Chira-Piura Water Management System, Peru

Reservoirs in Peru
Buildings and structures in Piura Region